William McLachlan may refer to:

 William McLachlan (figure skater), Canadian ice dancer
 William McLachlan (footballer) (born 1989), Scottish footballer